Amt Joachimsthal (Schorfheide) is an Amt ("collective municipality") in the district of Barnim, in Brandenburg, Germany. Its seat is in the town of Joachimsthal in the Schorfheide region.

The Amt Joachimsthal consists of the following municipalities:
Althüttendorf
Friedrichswalde
Joachimsthal 
Ziethen

Demography 

Joachimsthal
Barnim